Magdalena Łazarkiewicz, née Holland (born 6 July 1954 in Warsaw) is a Polish film director and screenwriter.

Life and career 
Magdalena Łazarkiewicz was born on 6 July 1954 in Warsaw as a daughter of Polish  communist politician Henryk Holland who was of Jewish origins and his wife, Polish Catholic journalist Irena Rybczyńska-Holland. Łazarkiewicz graduated in cultural studies from University of Wrocław and radio and television studies from University of Silesia in Katowice.

She is a sister of Polish film director Agnieszka Holland and an aunt of storyboard artist Katarzyna Adamik. Magdalena Łazarkiewicz was married to director Piotr Łazarkiewicz until his death in 2008. They have two children – son Antoni Komasa-Łazarkiewicz (composer) and daughter Gabriela Łazarkiewicz.

Selected filmography 
2011 – Głęboka Woda (TV series)
2010 – Maraton Tańca (Dance Marathon)
2006–2007 – Ekipa (TV series)
2001–2002 – Marzenia do spełnienia (TV series)
1999 – Na koniec świata (The End of the World)
1997 – Drugi brzeg
1995 – Odjazd (Departure) - TV series co-directed with Piotr Łazarkiewicz
1992 – Białe małżeństwo (White Marriage)
1991 – Odjazd (Departure) - co-directed with Piotr Łazarkiewicz
1989 – Ostatni dzwonek (The Last Schoolbell)
1985 – Przez dotyk (By Touch)

References

External links
 
  About Magdalena Łazarkiewicz - Ann Arbor Polish Film Festival
 Magdalena Łazarkiewicz at the Filmpolski Database 
 

1954 births
Polish film directors
Polish women film directors
Polish screenwriters
Polish women screenwriters
Polish people of Jewish descent
Living people